Pantothenate kinase 1 is an enzyme that in humans is encoded by the PANK1 gene. 

This gene encodes a protein belonging to the pantothenate kinase family, which in mammals is made of up PANK1, PANK2, PANK3, and PANK4. Pantothenate kinase is a key regulatory enzyme in the biosynthesis of coenzyme A (CoA) in bacteria and mammalian cells. It catalyzes the first committed step in the universal biosynthetic pathway leading to CoA and is itself subject to regulation through feedback inhibition by CoA. Alternative splicing has been observed at this locus and three variants, each encoding a distinct isoform, have been identified.

References

Further reading